Gentleman Ruffin is a 1980 album by former Temptations singer David Ruffin (1941-1991), which was his final solo album.

Track listing

Side One
"I Wanna Be with You" (Ben Adkins)
"All I Need" (David T. Garner)
"Love Supply" (Marilyn McLeod)
"Still in Love with You" (Arenita Walker, Cynthia Girty)

Side Two
"I Got a Thing for You" (Marilyn McLeod, Pam Sawyer)
"Can We Make Love One More Time" (James Nelson, Les Jones)
"Slow Dance" (Curtis Gadson, Ron Sanders, Roz Newberry)
"Don't You Go Home" (Anita Brown)

Personnel
David Ruffin - vocals
Bruce Nazarian, Eddie Willis - guitar
Anthony Willis, Greg Coles - bass
George Roundtree, Rudy Robinson - keyboards
Gary Nester, Vassal Benford - synthesizer
Jerry Jones, Lee Marcus - drums
Carl "Butch" Small, Larry Fratangelo - percussion
Brandye, Carolyn Franklin, Diane Lewis, Pat Lewis, Diane Hogan, Leon Ware, Marcus Cummings, Ronnie McNeir - backing vocals

Chart history

Singles

References

1980 albums
Albums produced by Don Davis (record producer)
Warner Records albums
David Ruffin albums
Albums recorded at United Western Recorders